The Jupiter, ex-Goding Stradivarius is a violin constructed in 1722 by the famous luthier Antonio Stradivari of Cremona. It is one of only 700 extant Stradivari instruments in the world today.

The Jupiter is owned by the Nippon Music Foundation.

It was on extended loan to Midori prior to her receiving the 1731c ex-Gibson/ex-Huberman del Gesu, which is now her concert instrument.
Her play of Jupiter is available from the recording of "Sibelius Violin Concerto" with Israel Philharmonic Orchestra by Sony Classical.  She quit playing Jupiter in a short time because the body and neck were too big for her, such that it often hurt her hands, fingers, and arms.

And then, it was on loan to Daishin Kashimoto and Manrico Padovani.

It is currently on loan to Ryu Goto since December 2013.

References

See also
Stradivarius
Jupiter Stradivarius

1722 works
Stradivari violins
Stradivari instruments